Cheng Rongshi (18 October 1927 – 7 February 2021) was a Chinese physical chemist and academician of the Chinese Academy of Sciences.

Biography
Cheng was born in Yixing, Jiangsu, on 18 October 1927. In 1945, he was admitted to the University of Nanking, where he studied chemistry under . After graduating in 1949, he did his postgraduate work at Peking University.

In 1951, he was dispatched to the Shanghai Institute of Physical Chemistry, Chinese Academy of Sciences. That same year, he moved to Changchun and worked at Changchun Institute of Applied Chemistry. In 1983, he joined the faculty of Nanjing University. In 1995, he became a professor and director of Macromolecule Research Institute of South China University of Technology.

On 7 February 2021, he died of illness in Guangzhou, Guangdong, aged 93.

Honours and awards
 1991 Member of the Chinese Academy of Sciences (CAS)

References

1927 births
2021 deaths
People from Yixing
Scientists from Jiangsu
University of Nanking alumni
Peking University alumni
Academic staff of Nanjing University
Academic staff of the South China University of Technology
Members of the Chinese Academy of Sciences
Chinese physical chemists